Aria Finger is the former CEO of DoSomething.org and the President of the TMI agency. She is currently the Chief of Staff to Reid Hoffman. She also co-hosts, along with Hoffman, the Possible podcast. According to its creators, the podcast, released in March of 2023, “sketches out the brightest version of the future—and what it will take to get there” and asks “what if, in the future, everything breaks humanity's way?.” The first episode featured an interview with Trevor Noah.

Background 

Aria attended Washington University in St. Louis where she graduated magna cum laude in economics and political science in 2005.

Aria joined DoSomething.org in 2005 as an associate, working on varied aspects of the organization including running campaigns and business development, obtaining strategic partnerships, and writing web content. She was named COO of DoSomething in 2010 and president of DoSomething subsidiary company TMI in 2013. Aria was appointed as CEO of DoSomething.org at the end of October 2015.

Aria also serves as an adjunct professor of nonprofit business management at New York University.

Campaigns 

Some of the biggest campaigns that Aria has worked on include: Teens for Jeans, Give a Spit About Cancer, and Thumb Wars

External links
 Personal website with extended bio 
 Professional site

References 

Year of birth missing (living people)
Living people
American chief operating officers
New York University faculty
American women chief executives
American nonprofit chief executives
Washington University in St. Louis alumni